is a Japanese-British actress and model who is affiliated with Ten Carat.

Biography

Early life 
Nakajō was born in Abeno-ku, Osaka in 1997. Her mother is Japanese and her father is British. She grew up in a family with her mother, father, and sister.

She played badminton during high school as a junior.

Model 
In 2011, she auditioned for the female fashion magazine Seventeen. She was selected in the Grand Prix with models such as Yua Shinkawa.

In 2012, Nakajō first participated as a model in Tokyo Girls Collection in the 2012S/S season.

In September 2017, Nakajō officially became an exclusive model for CanCam.

Actress
In 2012, Nakajō debuted in the television drama, Miss Double Faced Teacher, as Yuyaku Umehara.

In 2014, her first starring role in a film was Fatal Frame: The Movie.

Filmography

TV series

Films

Awards

References

External links
 Official profile at Ten Carat 
 Official profile at Seventeen 
 Official profile at CanCam 

Japanese female models
1997 births
Living people
Actresses from Osaka
Japanese film actresses
Japanese television actresses
21st-century Japanese actresses
Japanese people of British descent